The Central District of Gorgan County is a district (bakhsh) in Gorgan County, Golestan Province, Iran. At the 2006 census, its population was 345,813, in 92,929 families.  The District has two cities: Gorgan & Jelin-e Olya.  The District has three rural districts (dehestans): Anjirabad Rural District, Estarabad-e Jonubi Rural District, and Roshanabad Rural District.

References 

Districts of Golestan Province
Gorgan County